Alexandru II Mircea (3 March 1529 – 11 September 1577) was a Voivode or Prince of Wallachia from 1568 to 1574 and 1574 to 1577. He was the father of Mihnea II Turcitul. His parents were Mircea III Dracul and Maria Despina. Raised by the Turks in Istanbul, he hardly knew his country of origin before gaining the throne of Wallachia.

Rule
Alexandru and his wife Catherine Salvaresso came to Bucharest in June 1574. Like his great-grandfather Vlad III Dracula, he was known for cruelty, by slaughtering dissident boyars. Eventually, Alexandru was poisoned by noblemen claiming to be loyal to him.

References 

|-

Rulers of Wallachia
16th-century rulers in Europe
16th-century Romanian people
Year of birth unknown
Year of death unknown
House of Drăculești
1529 births